The Shanghai Cooperation Organisation (SCO) is an international alliance that consists of 8 member states and 4 observers from Eurasia. It was established on 26 April 1996 as the Shanghai Five.
In addition to the 8 member states and 4 observers, the SCO currently has 9 dialogue partners and 4 guest attendance entries.

Member states

Military personnel
The following list is sourced from the 2018 edition of "The Military Balance" published annually by the International Institute for Strategic Studies.

Notes

Observer states

Dialogue partner entries

Future participation
Observer Iran has submitted an application for full membership. On September 17, 2021, the SCO has officially launched the procedures of Iran's accession to the SCO as a full member, which are expected to take "a fair amount of time".

Meanwhile, in 2012 Armenia, Azerbaijan, Bangladesh, East Timor, Nepal and Sri Lanka applied for observer status within the organization. Egypt and Syria has also submitted an application for observer status, while Egypt, Israel, Maldives and Ukraine have applied for dialogue partner status. 
Saudi Arabia, Bahrain and Qatar  has officially applied to join the SCO.  In 2022, Erdogan announced that Turkey would seek full SCO membership status.

Guest attendance entries
 Association of Southeast Asian Nations (ASEAN)
 Commonwealth of Independent States (CIS)
 Turkmenistan

Notes

References

Bibliography

 
Shanghai Cooperation Organisation
International military organizations
Countries by international organization